Oliver Cuadrado Martín (born 12 July 1977), known simply as Oliver, is a Spanish retired footballer who played as a goalkeeper, and is the goalkeeper coach of Getafe CF.

Football career
Born in Madrid, Oliver spent 12 years connected to local – and La Liga – giants Real Madrid. He only appeared with their B and C-sides during his tenure, even though he occasionally trained with the first team managed by Vicente del Bosque, also being called for some games without however making his debut. He was included in Real's squad for the 2000 FIFA Club World Championship.

Leaving the club in 2000, Oliver signed with SD Compostela in the second division, appearing in 14 league matches in his first season, which ended in relegation. After being first-choice as the Galicians returned to the second level, he was again backup in the 2002–03 campaign, with Compos again dropping down a division in spite of having finished in ninth position; after a 1–2 loss against relegation-threatened Córdoba CF on 15 June 2003, he was accused of having been paid to help the visitors win (not holding an easy shot attempt in the Andalusians' second goal), but nothing was ever proved.

Subsequently, Oliver resumed his career in divisions three and four, also having a spell in Switzerland with SC Young Fellows Juventus.

References

External links

1977 births
Living people
Footballers from Madrid
Spanish footballers
Association football goalkeepers
Segunda División players
Segunda División B players
Tercera División players
Real Madrid C footballers
Real Madrid Castilla footballers
Real Madrid CF players
SD Compostela footballers
CD Toledo players
CD Guadalajara (Spain) footballers
CF Extremadura footballers
CD Paracuellos Antamira players
Spanish expatriate footballers
Expatriate footballers in Switzerland